The Far Arena is a 1978 novel by Richard Sapir, writing under the slightly modified pen name of Richard Ben Sapir. It chronicles the adventures of Eugeni, a Roman gladiator from the age of Domitian, who, due to a highly unlikely series of events, is frozen in ice for nineteen centuries before being found by the Houghton Oil Company on a prospecting mission in the north Atlantic.

Summary

Lew McCardle is a geologist working for Houghton Oil, which has reason to believe that there is oil in the far north. While running a test drill, the machine accidentally uncovers the frozen body of a man. Lew is given charge of the body, and he immediately calls Semyon Petrovitch, who is a Soviet scientist. Petrovitch, who specializes in cryonics (but not cryogenics, as he explains) immediately takes the body to be revived, explaining that it is easier to treat such a case as alive until it is proven that life cannot be restored. The blood is pumped from the body, and various treatments are administered until, amazingly, he does come back to life. He spends the next fifteen days in a deep sleep, muttering to himself. The mutterings are recorded, but no-one can figure out the language. Finally, Lew McCardle, who has eight years of Latin, sends for a Catholic nun, who joins him and Petrovitch on their quest to sort out the mysteries of the revived man.

The story is similar to the film Iceman (1984 film), though "The Far Arena" came first.

Notes
Lew McCardle's Latin training changes through the book. Early on, it says he had seven years; later, it says eight.
This book, although reasonably well lauded when released, is long out of print .

as of March 2019 this book is available from Amazon in both ebook and paper formats.
as of November 2022 this book is available at Audible

See also

Cryonics
Ötzi the Iceman
Haraldskær Woman

1978 science fiction novels
1978 American novels